Boleniec  (German: Bollenz) is a former village in the administrative district of Gmina Smołdzino, within Słupsk County, Pomeranian Voivodeship, in northern Poland.

See also
History of Pomerania

References

Boleniec